Control Risks is a global risk and strategic consulting firm specializing in political, security and integrity risk.

History
Control Risks was formed in 1975, as a professional adviser to the insurance industry. A subsidiary of insurance broker Hogg Robinson, the firm aimed to minimize their exposure to kidnap and ransom payouts. The firm expanded its capabilities when these crisis management and incident response specialists were joined by political and security risk analysts, before becoming independent in 1982 following a management buyout.

See also
 ArmorGroup
 FTI Consulting
 Navigant 
 Eurasia Group
 Kroll
 Le Beck International
 Pinkerton

References

External links

Companies based in the London Borough of Southwark
Consulting firms established in 1975
Security consulting firms
Private intelligence agencies
1975 establishments in England